City of neighbourhoods or City of neighborhoods may refer to:


Places
 Toronto, Ontario, Canada; see History of neighbourhoods in Toronto
 Vancouver, British Columbia, Canada
 Chicago, Illinois, United States, see Community areas in Chicago
 Baltimore, Maryland, United States
 Boston, Massachusetts, United States

Other uses
 City of Neighbourhoods, a 2004 album by Neufeld-Occhipinti Jazz Orchestra and a song on the album
 This City of Neighborhoods, a 2008 album by The Seldon Plan